Joseph Beattie (born 1978) is an English actor, known for portraying Malachi in the second season of Hex (2004) and Henry Crawford in Mansfield Park (2007).

Background
Beattie attended King Alfred School in Hampstead and later trained at Guildhall School of Music and Drama. He is a former member of the National Youth Music Theatre.

Career
Beattie made his film debut in The Browning Version (1994), and won a role in Velvet Goldmine (1998) while still at Guildhall. He has also appeared in the direct-to-video film Volcano: Nature Unleashed (also called Volcano or The Volcano Disaster), as Antonio, and Brideshead Revisited (2008), as Anthony Blanche.

On television, Beattie's first lead role was that of Flashman in the 2005 ITV adaptation of Tom Brown's Schooldays. His other television credits include Colditz, Malice Aforethought, Hex, Mansfield Park and Marple: A Pocket Full of Rye. He played Eric Visnjic in the television pilot Fast Track: No Limits, written by Lee Goldberg.

Beattie's stage work includes a Covent Garden Festival production of A Midsummer Night's Dream, playing Puck.

Filmography

Television

Film

References

External links

Joseph Beattie official fansite
Joseph Beattie Fans

Alumni of the Guildhall School of Music and Drama
English male television actors
English male film actors
English male stage actors
1978 births
Living people